NGC 14 is an irregular galaxy in the Pegasus constellation. It was included in Halton Arp's Atlas of Peculiar Galaxies, under the section "Galaxies with the appearance of fission," since the irregular appearance of this galaxy causes it to look like it is coming apart. It was discovered on September the 18th 1786 by William Herschel.

References

External links
 
 

17860918
0014
00075
00647
235
Pegasus (constellation)
NGC 0014